Cychrus baxiensis is a species of ground beetle in the subfamily of Carabinae that is endemic to Sichuan, province of China. It was described by Deuve in 1997.

References

baxiensis
Beetles described in 1997
Endemic fauna of Sichuan
Beetles of Asia